Zrkovci is a settlement on the right bank of the Drava River east of Maribor in northeastern Slovenia. It is a suburb of Maribor and belongs to the City Municipality of Maribor.

References

External links
Zrkovci on Geopedia

Populated places in the City Municipality of Maribor